Santa Cruz is a county in southern Arizona, United States. As of the 2020 census, the population is 47,669. The county seat is Nogales. The county was established in 1899. It borders Pima County to the north and west, Cochise County to the east, and the Mexican state of Sonora to the south.

Santa Cruz County includes the Nogales, Arizona Micropolitan Statistical Area, which is also included in the Tucson-Nogales, Arizona Combined Statistical Area.

History

Santa Cruz County, formed on March 15, 1899, out of what was then Pima County, is named after the Santa Cruz River. The river originates in the Canelo Hills in the eastern portion of the county, crosses south into Mexico near the community of Santa Cruz, Sonora and then bends northwards returning into the United States (and Santa Cruz County) east of Nogales.

Father Eusebio Kino, an Italian explorer and missionary in the service of the Spanish Empire, named the Santa Cruz River–"holy cross" in Spanish–in the 1690s. In addition, Kino founded several missions to evangelize the different O'odham peoples living along the banks of the Santa Cruz River, including Missions San Cayetano del Tumacácori (1691) and San Gabriel de Guevavi (1691), as well as Los Reyes de Sonoita (1692) near Sonoita Creek. Along the river, but outside the boundaries of Santa Cruz County, Kino also founded Mission San Xavier del Bac (1692) near Tucson, Arizona, and Mission Santa Maria del Pilar (1693) in what is now Santa Cruz, Mexico. Kino's San Cayetano and San Gabriel missions were destroyed in the O'odham peoples' 1751 Pima Revolt and rebuilt as Missions Los Santos Ángeles de Guevavi (1751),  San José de Tumacácori (1753), and San Cayetano de Calabazas (1756). The ruins of all three of these later missions are now protected by Tumacácori National Historical Park. Disease, warfare, overwork, and changes in land ownership during Spanish colonization led to the demographic decline of the O'odham peoples of Santa Cruz County.

Geography

It is the smallest county by area in Arizona.

Adjacent counties and municipalities
 Pima County–west, north
 Cochise County–east
 Nogales, Sonora, Mexico–south
 Santa Cruz, Sonora, Mexico–south
 Sáric, Sonora, Mexico–south

Major highways
  Interstate 19
  State Route 82
  State Route 83

National protected areas
 Coronado National Forest (part)
 Las Cienegas National Conservation Area (part)
 Tumacácori National Historical Park

Border crossings
There are three crossings of the U.S.-Mexico border in Nogales: the Dennis DeConcini Port of Entry (for vehicular and pedestrian traffic); the Nogales-Mariposa Port of Entry (in the western part of the city, for vehicular and pedestrian traffic); and the Morley Gate Port of Entry (for pedestrians only). Lochiel, a former mining and ranching border town, formerly had a border crossing, but the U.S. government shut the port of entry down in 1983.

Demographics

2000 census
As of the census of 2000, there were 38,381 people, 11,809 households, and 9,506 families living in the county.  The population density was 31 people per square mile (12/km2).  There were 13,036 housing units at an average density of 10 per square mile (4/km2).  The racial makeup of the county was 76.0% White, 0.4% Black or African American, 0.7% Native American, 0.5% Asian, 0.1% Pacific Islander, 19.7% from other races, and 2.6% from two or more races.  80.8% of the population were Hispanic or Latino of any race. 79.7% of the population reported speaking Spanish at home, while 19.5% speak English .

There were 11,809 households, of which 45.6% had children under the age of 18 living with them, 61.3% were married couples living together, 15.4% had a female householder with no husband present, and 19.5% were non-families. 16.5% of all households were made up of individuals, and 7.1% had someone living alone who was 65 years of age or older.  The average household size was 3.23 and the average family size was 3.66.

In the county, the population was spread out, with 33.6% under the age of 18, 8.2% from 18 to 24, 26.6% from 25 to 44, 20.8% from 45 to 64, and 10.7% who were 65 years of age or older.  The median age was 32 years. For every 100 females there were 91.7 males.  For every 100 females age 18 and over, there were 86.2 males.

The median income for a household in the county was $29,710, and the median income for a family was $32,057. Males had a median income of $27,972 versus $21,107 for females. The per capita income for the county was $13,278.  About 21.40% of families and 24.50% of the population were below the poverty line, including 29.% of those under age 18 and 23.2% of those age 65 or over.

2010 census
As of the census of 2010, there were 47,420 people, 15,437 households, and 11,992 families living in the county. The racial makeup of the county was 73.5% white, 0.7% American Indian, 0.5% Asian, 0.4% black or African American, 22.9% from other races, and 2.0% from two or more races. Those of Hispanic or Latino origin made up 82.8% of the population.

The largest ancestry groups were:

 78.1% Mexican
 4.3% German
 3.4% Irish
 3.1% English
 2.3% American
 1.8% Italian

Of the 15,437 households, 45.6% had children under the age of 18 living with them, 55.7% were married couples living together, 17.1% had a female householder with no husband present, 22.3% were non-families, and 19.0% of all households were made up of individuals. The average household size was 3.05 and the average family size was 3.51. The median age was 35.6 years.

The median income for a household in the county was $36,519 and the median income for a family was $40,933. Males had a median income of $30,666 versus $25,135 for females. The per capita income for the county was $16,209. About 20.6% of families and 25.2% of the population were below the poverty line, including 36.8% of those under age 18 and 15.7% of those age 65 or over.

Communities

Cities
 Nogales (county seat)

Towns
 Patagonia

Census designated places

 Amado
 Beyerville
 Elgin
 Kino Springs
 Rio Rico
 Sonoita
 Tubac
 Tumacacori-Carmen

Unincorporated communities

 Harshaw
 Oro Blanco
 Carmen
 Lochiel
 Trench Camp
 Casa Piedra
 Madera Canyon
 Washington Camp

Ghost Towns

 Alto
 Canelo
 Calabasas
 Duquesne
 Fort Buchanan
 Harshaw
 Lochiel
 Oro Blanco
 Ruby

Education
School districts include:

K-12:
 Nogales Unified School District
 Santa Cruz Valley Unified School District

Secondary:
 Patagonia Union High School District

Elementary:
 Patagonia Elementary District
 Santa Cruz Elementary District
 Sonoita Elementary District

County population ranking
The population ranking of the following table is based on the 2010 census of Santa Cruz County.

† county seat

Politics
Owing to its border location and Hispanic majority population, Santa Cruz is a strongly Democratic county. The last Republican to win the county was George H. W. Bush in 1988, and although the Republicans won the county in six consecutive election from 1968 to 1988, three of these wins were by very narrow margins. Following the trends seen in majority Hispanic counties across the United States, Joe Biden defeated Donald Trump with 67.1% of the popular vote in the county, a slightly lower margin than Hillary Clinton's 71.1% vote share in 2016. Despite this rightward shift in the vote share, Santa Cruz County remains as the most Democratic-leaning county in Arizona.

Economy
Because it is the smallest County, Santa Cruz County's economic activity is also smaller. Its agriculture consists primarily of forage/hay, and the cattle products raised on that pasture and hay are almost 100% of farm products annually.

See also

 National Register of Historic Places listings in Santa Cruz County, Arizona

References

External links
 Nogales Chamber of Commerce Website 
 County Website 
 Geologic Map of the Patagonia Mountains, Santa Cruz County, Arizona U.S. Geological Survey

 
1899 establishments in Arizona Territory
Populated places established in 1899
Hispanic and Latino American culture in Arizona